Phoebe Lucille Bridgers (born August 17, 1994) is an American singer-songwriter. Her indie folk music typically centers around acoustic guitar and electronic production, with melancholic lyrical themes. She has received four Grammy Award nominations, including Best New Artist.

Born in Pasadena, California, Bridgers performed music in her youth and was a member of Sloppy Jane. She released her debut solo album Stranger in the Alps in 2017, followed by Punisher (2020), both of which received critical acclaim. She is also a member of supergroup Boygenius, with whom she has released one self-titled EP and one album, and Better Oblivion Community Center, with whom she has released one self-titled album.

A frequent collaborator, she has worked with various other artists including Kid Cudi, the 1975, and Christian Lee Hutson. Bridgers holds progressive political views and has advocated and fundraised for various causes.

Early life 
Phoebe Lucille Bridgers was born in Pasadena, California, on August 17, 1994. Her mother, Jamie, works in real estate and stand up comedy, while her father was a film and television set builder. She has a younger brother named Jackson. Her parents divorced when she was 19 years old. She was raised in Pasadena, but also spent some of her childhood in Ukiah, California. As a child, she made extra money by busking at the Pasadena Farmers Market, and started playing guitar around the age of 13. After graduating from the Sequoyah School, she began studying vocal jazz at the Los Angeles County High School for the Arts in 2009. She was later accepted into the Berklee College of Music in Boston, but dropped out after orientation.

Career

Early beginnings and Stranger in the Alps (2014–2018) 
Bridgers was a member of various groups while still in high school, including Einstein's Dirty Secret and Sloppy Jane, and frequently played shows around Los Angeles as a solo act. After deciding not to attend college to focus on her career, her growing presence in the L.A. music scene led to her befriending producer Tony Berg, who began working with her on her first album for free. Playing in an Apple commercial with Sloppy Jane had given her some financial security, so she planned to complete her record and then sell it to a label, rather than attempting to get signed first. This allowed her much more time and creative freedom to create what would become Stranger in the Alps. Around this time, Bridgers met American singer-songwriter Ryan Adams through mutual collaborators, and he put out her EP Killer on his label PAX AM. Bridgers also supported Julien Baker on her 2016 tour of the East Coast.

In January 2017, Bridgers released the single "Smoke Signals" and opened for Conor Oberst on his European tour. The two had met the previous summer at a secret showcase, organized by Oberst at the Bootleg Theater in Los Angeles. He and his Bright Eyes bandmate, Mike Mogis, contributed vocals and production to Stranger in the Alps. Bridgers joined The Joy Formidable and Ryan Adams for select dates on their respective U.S. tours before playing at South by Southwest in March 2017. In June 2017, Bridgers signed to independent label Dead Oceans.

She released her debut studio album, Stranger in the Alps, in September to critical acclaim. The album was produced by Tony Berg, Ethan Gruska and Rob Moose, all of whom would become consistent collaborators with Bridgers. To promote the album, Bridgers performed on CBS This Morning and the NPR Tiny Desk. Numerous songs from the record were featured in television productions throughout 2018, including Switched at Birth, Castle, Burden of Truth, Lethal Weapon and Trinkets, among others.

Bridgers has been referred to as a "serial collaborator", and has either been featured on or co-released tracks with: Lord Huron, Fiona Apple, Matt Berninger and the National, Manchester Orchestra, the 1975, Maggie Rogers, Kid Cudi, Taylor Swift, and SZA, among others. In addition, she has participated in full-album projects with Conor Oberst, Julien Baker and Lucy Dacus.

Boygenius and Better Oblivion Community Center (2018–2019) 

In 2018, Bridgers teamed up with fellow indie singer-songwriters Julien Baker and Lucy Dacus to form the group Boygenius, signed to Matador Records. They released three songs in August 2018 and subsequently announced an eponymous EP, which was released on October 26, 2018, to widespread acclaim. Pitchfork called the collaboration "magic". The band toured the U.S. in November, appearing on Late Night with Seth Meyers and the NPR Tiny Desk.

On December 5, 2018, Bridgers released a Spotify Singles session recorded at Spotify Studios NYC featuring a performance of "Scott Street" and a cover of the Cure's "Friday I'm in Love".

Bridgers and Conor Oberst announced the formation of their band, Better Oblivion Community Center, on The Late Show with Stephen Colbert in January 2019. They released their debut album later that month through Dead Oceans. The band appeared on CBS This Morning, and Bridgers appeared for the third time on NPR's Tiny Desk series. Bob Boilen, creator of the Tiny Desk Concerts, said of their album: "It's that rare musical partnership where each injects vibrancy into the other's creative side."

Punisher and Reunion Tour (2020–present) 
On February 26, Bridgers released the single "Garden Song" alongside its music video. In April, the 1975 released the song "Jesus Christ 2005 God Bless America" with Bridgers, ahead of their studio album Notes on a Conditional Form, which features Bridgers on three tracks. She was slated to tour with them in summer 2020 before the tour's cancellation due to the COVID-19 pandemic. On April 9, 2020, Bridgers released "Kyoto" and announced on Instagram that her second album Punisher would be released on June 19, 2020. Bridgers released the album a day earlier than stated, stating: "I'm not [delaying] the record until things go back to 'normal' because I don't think they should. Here it is a little early." The album received widespread positive reviews. In July 2020, Bridgers released the music video for her single "I Know the End". While working on Punisher, Bridgers also produced Christian Lee Hutson's album Beginners, which was released on Anti- Records in May 2020. That September, she played to an all-virtual audience of 4 million at Red Rocks Amphitheatre as part of their Unpaused Concert Series. In October, Bridgers announced the formation of her own label Saddest Factory, an imprint of Dead Oceans.

While awaiting the results of the 2020 United States presidential election on November 3, Bridgers tweeted that she would cover "Iris" by Goo Goo Dolls if then-president Donald Trump lost. The cover, which was recorded as a duet with Maggie Rogers under the name Phoebe & Maggie, was released exclusively on Bridgers' Bandcamp page for one day only on November 13. The song received 28,000 downloads with proceeds going to Stacey Abrams' Fair Fight Action organization to promote fair elections both in the state of Georgia and nationwide. On November 10, Bridgers announced an EP of four reworked tracks from Punisher, entitled Copycat Killer, in collaboration with Rob Moose. Copycat Killer was released digitally on November 20, 2020. On November 23, Bridgers released a cover of Merle Haggard's "If We Make It Through December", with proceeds going to LA's Downtown Women's Center.

Bridgers garnered four nominations at the 63rd Annual Grammy Awards for Best New Artist, Best Rock Performance, Best Rock Song and Best Alternative Music Album. In December 2020, she released a music video for the song "Savior Complex", directed by Phoebe Waller-Bridge and starring Paul Mescal. That same month Bridgers also featured on Kid Cudi's track "Lovin Me", on his album Man on the Moon III: The Chosen (2020), and sang backing vocals on two songs by Charlie Hickey.

Bridgers was a musical guest on the eleventh episode of the 46th season of Saturday Night Live, playing "Kyoto" and "I Know the End" and closing the performance by smashing her guitar on a fake stage monitor. On March 9, 2021, Bridgers released a second Spotify Singles session featuring a cover of John Prine's "Summer's End" and a version of "Kyoto" featuring vocals from Jackson Browne. In August 2021 it was announced that Bridgers would appear on The Killers' album Pressure Machine on the track "Runaway Horses", released August 13. That same month, she released a cover of Metallica's 1991 song "Nothing Else Matters"; the song appeared on the cover album The Metallica Blacklist released the following month as one of 12 covers of the song. She also provided background vocals on five tracks from Lorde's third album, Solar Power, released on August 20.

On September 3, 2021, Bridgers embarked on the Reunion Tour, starting in St. Louis, Missouri. She featured on Muna's single "Silk Chiffon" released September 7 on Saddest Factory. She also featured on the song "Atlantis" from Noah Gundersen's album, A Pillar of Salt, released in October 2021. On October 13, Bridgers' version of Bo Burnham's "That Funny Feeling" opened at No. 2 on both the Rock & Alternative Digital Song Sales, and Alternative Digital Song Sales charts.

On November 12, 2021, Bridgers appeared on Taylor Swift's second re-recorded album Red (Taylor's Version) on the track "Nothing New". The song debuted and peaked at No. 43 on the Billboard Hot 100, becoming Bridgers' highest-peaking entry on the chart. On November 30, she released a cover of "Day After Tomorrow" by Tom Waits, continuing her tradition of releasing a cover for the holidays. Proceeds from the release were donated to an organization supporting refugees and human trafficking victims in California. On December 15, 2021, Bridgers appeared on true crime comedy podcast, My Favorite murder, to discuss with the hosts her "hometown" crime story: the murder of 16-year-old Marissa Mathy-Zvaifler at the Sunshine Theater.

On April 15, 2022, Bridgers released "Sidelines", a song featured on Conversations with Friends, a Hulu adaptation of Sally Rooney's novel with the same name. On July 8 of the same year she released a cover of the 1972 single "Goodbye to Love" by The Carpenters for the Minions: The Rise of Gru soundtrack, and on July 12 was announced to be featured on a song titled 'Stonecatchers' on Marcus Mumford's new solo album, Self-Titled. In August 2022, it was announced that Bridgers would be starring in I Saw the TV Glow, an A24 horror film directed by Jane Schoenbrun and produced by Emma Stone and Dave McCary.

Bridgers will be an opening act on multiple shows of the US leg of Taylor Swift's upcoming The Eras Tour. On November 18, 2022, she covered the Handsome Family’s song "So Much Wine" on her tradition of releasing a cover for the holidays, with proceeds from the single benefit the Los Angeles LGBT Center. The song was provided with vocals from Andrew Bird, organist Ethan Gruska, guitarist Harrison Whitford and Bridgers' then-partner, actor Paul Mescal. On December 9, 2022, Bridgers appeared on the track "Ghost in the Machine" with SZA, on her second album SOS. In the same month, she performed at two of Danny Elfman's concerts of The Nightmare Before Christmas soundtrack, taking the part of Sally. In January 2023, Boygenius reunited and announced their debut album The Record out March 31, and released singles "$20","True Blue", and "Emily I'm Sorry". In February 2023, Bridgers featured on "Adderall" by English post-punk band and Dead Oceans labelmate Shame, the third single from their third album Food for Worms.

Artistry and themes 

Bridgers' musical style has been described as mainly indie rock, indie folk, emo-folk, and indie pop. It often centers acoustic guitar, and incorporates atmospheric strings, production and electronic instrumentation. Her music has been described as "anxious", "melancholy" and "haunting". Themes include death, trauma, therapy, depression and strained relationships, "undercut by her dry wit" and "straightforward delivery." Several of Bridgers' songs are about personal issues. For example, "Kyoto" was inspired by her relationship with her father, while "Motion Sickness" and "ICU" are about past breakups. Her complex storytelling and use of evocative imagery, such as in "Garden Song", have also been commended.

Bridgers has cited Elliott Smith as one of her favorite artists and the biggest influence on her songwriting and production style. Her song "Punisher" explores her meeting Smith if he were still alive. Other musical influences include bluegrass music, Bright Eyes, the Replacements, Blake Mills, Tom Waits, Avril Lavigne, The Beatles, Jackson Browne, Taylor Swift and Nine Inch Nails. Her music often features a wide variety of popular culture references — the writing of author Joan Didion, ASMR videos, television series Fleabag, and true crime podcast My Favorite Murder were all influential in the making of Punisher.

In 2021, she received the Libera Awards as both Best Live/Livestream Act and Record of the Year 2021 for her album Punisher (Dead Oceans) by the American Association of Independent Music (A2IM).

Both of Bridgers' albums contain Halloween-themed visual motifs, with the album covers of Stranger in the Alps and Punisher containing ghost and skeleton imagery respectively. She is known for wearing variations of a skeleton onesie, inspired by her reported love for "creepy and corny stuff". Her fans are often referred to as "Pharbs", a play on Nicki Minaj fans calling themselves "Barbs".

Politics and activism 
Bridgers is associated with American progressivism. Bridgers, Fiona Apple, and Matt Berninger released a cover of Simon and Garfunkel's 1966 song "7 O'Clock News/Silent Night" updated to reflect events in 2019, including the murder of Botham Jean, the opioid epidemic in the United States, and the testimony of Mick Mulvaney in President Donald Trump's first impeachment trial.

In 2020, Bridgers expressed support for and encouraged donations to racial justice charities via her website and called for the abolition of police during Punisher release amid the George Floyd protests and released her and Maggie Rogers' cover of "Iris" as a single specifically to raise money for Stacey Abrams' Fair Fight Action, having vowed to release the cover if Trump lost the 2020 United States presidential election.

In October 2020, Bridgers performed as part of the virtual fundraiser festival "Village of Love" benefiting Planned Parenthood in Los Angeles and New York. At SXSW in 2022, Bridgers and Caleb Hearon criticized Greg Abbott's position on gender-affirming childcare and invited progressive politician Greg Casar to the stage. At a May 2022 concert in Florida, following the passage of Florida House Bill 1557, Bridgers repeatedly expressed disdain for Ron DeSantis.

Following the death of Queen Elizabeth II in September 2022, Bridgers shared a post from another account on Instagram which mourned the victims of colonialism during the monarch's reign.

Personal life 

Bridgers started a relationship with American musician Ryan Adams in 2014, when she was around 20 years old and he was around 40 years old. They broke up at an unknown date. Her song "Motion Sickness" is about their relationship. Bridgers and six other women accused Adams of emotional abuse in a 2019 report by The New York Times. Bridgers later dated American musician Marshall Vore, who works as her touring drummer and has collaborated with her on other music, until 2017; they co-wrote her single "ICU" about their relationship, and remain friends and collaborators. Bridgers was in a relationship with Irish actor Paul Mescal.

Bridgers identifies as bisexual, which initially caused a rift between her and her mother, though they later reconciled and her mother became an advocate for LGBT rights. Bridgers has been a pescetarian since her teenage years, something she admits her school peers would mock her about.

Bridgers has spoken about her struggles with depression and anxiety, for which she has sought therapy. In May 2022, following the leaked Supreme Court draft opinion overturning Roe v. Wade, she revealed that she had an abortion in October 2021 and said that everyone should have the right to do so.

Discography 

 Stranger in the Alps (2017)
 Better Oblivion Community Center with Conor Oberst as Better Oblivion Community Center (2019)
 Punisher (2020)
 The Record with Julien Baker and Lucy Dacus as Boygenius (2023)

Tours

Headlining
Stranger in the Alps Tour (2017–2018)
2018 Tour with Boygenius (2018)
2019 Tour with Better Oblivion Community Center (2019)
Reunion Tour (2021–2023)

Opening
 The Eras Tour with Taylor Swift (2023)

Accolades

References

External links 
 
 
 

1994 births
21st-century American women singers
21st-century American singers
American women singer-songwriters
American folk musicians
American indie pop musicians
American indie rock musicians
American women rock singers
Better Oblivion Community Center members
Bisexual singers
Bisexual songwriters
Bisexual women
Boygenius members
Dead Oceans artists
Feminist musicians
LGBT people from California
American LGBT singers
American LGBT songwriters
Living people
Los Angeles County High School for the Arts alumni
People from Pasadena, California
Singers from Los Angeles
20th-century American LGBT people
21st-century American LGBT people
American women guitarists
Guitarists from California
Singer-songwriters from California
American bisexual writers